The National Premier Leagues Victoria, commonly known as NPL Victoria, is a semi-professional soccer league in Victoria, Australia. The league is a part of the National Premier Leagues, and is the highest level within the Victorian soccer league system, serving jointly as the second tier within the overall Australian pyramid.

Administered by Football Victoria, NPL Victoria is the latest iteration of first division competitions in the state. Historically known as the Victorian State League and later as the Victorian Premier League, the league was first founded in 1908 as the Victorian Amateur League and would soon become the Victorian First Division. It adopted its current branding in 2014, following Football Federation Australia's 2012 National Competition Review.

NPL Victoria is contested by 14 clubs. Running from February to September each year, the league sees teams play 26 regular season fixtures, once at home and once away against each other club. The first-placed team at the conclusion of the regular season is termed the "premier". The top six-placed clubs then play a knock-out finals series, with the winner becoming the "champion". The bottom-placed teams operate a system of promotion and relegation with the division below, NPL Victoria 2.

The league premier qualifies as Victoria's representative in the national finals series, whilst the champion plays against the Dockerty Cup winner in the FV Community Shield.

History

The league commenced in 1909 with Carlton United being the first champions. It has run continuously except for a three season postponement from 1916 to 1918 owing to World War I. After 1945 the league, like fellow state competitions around the country, received a massive boost in numbers and quality with the post-war influx of European migrants, whose dominance was established so effectively that no club which had won the title before 1952, Juventus' first title, has won one since.

Juventus would go on to dominate the league in the 1950s, winning six titles, including five in a row from 1952 to 1956. In 1958, after the Victorian Amateur Soccer Federation was formed, the league became known as the Victorian State League. From 1962 until 1976 the league was largely dominated by South Melbourne Hellas and Footscray JUST, which won 11 titles between them.

With creation of the National Soccer League (NSL) in 1977, the league gradually lost most of its stronger clubs, a trend that reached its peak between 1984 and 1986, when the NSL used a split conference system. After 1987, however, the league slowly started regaining clubs, firstly those discarded when the conference system experiment was abandoned and later when clubs became permanently relegated by the NSL to their respective state leagues. The dominant side during the years from 1977 to 2004 was Green Gully, who won six titles during this period, despite also missing the years 1984–1986 from being in the NSL.

In 1991 the league rebranded again to become the Victorian Premier League and the first finals to determine the champions were staged in 1992, won by the newly promoted North Geelong. Following the demise of the NSL in 2004, the remaining two Victorian NSL teams Melbourne Knights and South Melbourne were granted permission to play in the VPL season of 2005. The league received a major boost at the start of the 2005 season when Vodafone became major naming rights sponsors, with the competition being renamed the Vodafone Cup. The 2005 season initially saw crowds attending in record numbers to witness the return of old derbies such as that between South Melbourne and Heidelberg United, but with the formation of the A-League filling the void of a national domestic league, 2006 saw a sharp decline in attendances.

The end of the 2006 season also witnessed a controversial finish to the relegation battle. With three teams finishing on 30 points, Sunshine George Cross were relegated on goal difference. However, a post-season appeal to the tribunal on the grounds that Essendon Royals had fielded a suspended player (Ilcho Mladenovski in round 24) saw the Royals deducted a point and relegated. Ultimately, both clubs reprised their position in the following season's competition with the inclusion of the Australian Institute of Sport evening out the numbers to 16, and as the first part of reforms to the competition set to be brought about in 2008.

The Australian Institute of Sport experiment was largely derided by the local clubs, and after their removal from the competition in 2008, the league reverted to 12 teams and a Top 5 Finals-Series in 2009. However, the concept of a youth development squad was reintroduced in 2010 with the National Training Centre team playing in midweek fixtures throughout the season but not for competition points. In 2011 the team, mostly comprising players from the Melbourne Victory youth squad, was renamed Victorian Training Centre Football and was eligible to score competition points for its matches but ineligible to qualify for the finals series or be relegated.

On 15 September 2013, Victoria Police arrested up to ten people, including Southern Stars FC players David Obaze, Nick McKoy and Joe Woolley as well as the coach, Zaya Younan, for allegations of match fixing. They are expected to be charged with corrupting the outcome of betting.

In early 2013, it was announced that Victoria would join the National Premier Leagues, with the Victorian Premier League expected to be rebranded for the 2014 season. Although Football Federation Victoria's initial proposal was halted with the announcement of a deferral in November 2013 after several clubs objected to the process for selecting team. However, by December 2013, a resolution was reached whereby Victorian teams would participate in the 2014 season.

Competition format
NPL Victoria comprises 14 teams. The season is staged during the Australian winter, running from February to September. The league combines aspects of both the traditional European-style round-robin and Australian-style finals series within its competition format.

Regular season
The regular season consists of a double round-robin. Each club plays every other club twice, once at home and once away, for a total of 26 matches. Teams receive three points for a win, one point for a draw and no points for a loss. The clubs are ranked first based on the number of points acquired during the season. If two teams have an equal number of points, they are separated firstly by goal difference and then the number of goals scored, calculated across all matches. The Rules of Competition provide head-to-head aggregate and head-to-head away goals as further tiebreakers if necessary. The team ranked first at the end of the regular season is termed the premiers, and becomes Victoria's entry for the national NPL finals.

Finals series
At the conclusion of the regular season, the six highest-ranked clubs qualify for the (Victorian) finals series. The finals take place over three weeks, with teams entering the series based on their respective finishes in the regular season. The teams ranked 3–6 enter at the elimination finals stage. The third-ranked team plays the sixth-ranked team, whilst the fourth-ranked team plays the fifth-ranked one. The two winners of the elimination finals meet the teams ranked 1 and 2 in the semi-finals. The premier in the regular season plays the lower-ranked qualifier from the elimination finals, whilst the runner-up plays the higher-ranked qualifier. The finals conclude with the grand final, played between the two winners of the semi-finals. The winner of the grand final is crowned the champions. As all finals matches require a winner, they are all knock-out fixtures. If a draw occurs at the end of normal time, 30 minutes of extra time are played. A penalty shoot-out is played if the teams are still drawn.

Promotion and relegation
NPL Victoria also operates a system of promotion and relegation with the division immediately below it, NPL 2. The 13th and 14th-ranked clubs are automatically relegated. From NPL 2, the winners of each of the conferences, East and West, are automatically promoted to replace the two lowest-ranked NPL clubs. The 12th-ranked NPL club also participates in a single-leg promotion/relegation play-off against an NPL 2 team, with the winner competing in the following year's NPL. The NPL 2 representative in the promotion/relegation play-off is determined by an earlier play-off between the runners-up of the two respective conferences.

Current clubs (2023)
The following clubs will take part in the 2023 NPL Victoria season:

NPL Honours

Honours pre-NPL

Honours table

Former Clubs (1963 onwards)
 Albion Leyland / Albion Rovers / Albion Turk Gucu / Melton Reds (1978–79, 1982–1985, 1990–1997)
 Altona City (1977–1981)
 Altona East Phoenix (1999–2003)
 Altona Gate / Altona Magic (1989–2010)
 Australian Institute of Sport (2007–2008)
 Box Hill / Box Hill Inter (1969–1973, 1983–1990, 1995–1996)
 Broadmeadows (1984)
 Broadmeadows City (1987)
 Caulfield City (1986–1990, 1993)
 Croydon City (1979–84)
 Doncaster Rovers (1995)
 Doveton (1981–1984, 1991)
 Essendon Lions / Lions (1962–1971)
 Essendon Royals / Triestina (1964–1965, 2001, 2003–2007)
 Fawkner Blues (1983–2004, 2007–2008)
 Fawkner-Whittlesea Blues (2005–2006)
 Fitzroy Serbia / Fitzroy City (2002)
 Footscray JUST / Melbourne City JUST (1963–1976, 1990)
 Frankston City (1977–1982)
 Frankston Pines (1984–1987, 1989–1990, 2003–2006, 2008)
 Goulburn Valley Suns FC (2014)
 Hakoah. St Kilda / St. Kilda Hellas-Hakoah (1963–1982)
 Juventus / Brunswick Juventus / Thomastown Zebras / Bulleen Inter Kings / Bulleen Zebras / Whittlesea Zebras / Moreland Zebras (1963–1983, 1989–93, 1996–2009, 2012)
 Keilor Austria / Austria (1972–1974)
 Knox City (1984–1985, 1992–1993, 2004)
 Kooyong JFC (2003-2005)
 Maribyrnong Polonia / Polonia (1963–77, 1982–1989)
 Melbourne / Melbourne Hungaria (1963–1975, 1986)
 Melbourne Victory Youth (2016)
 Moorabbin City (1998)
 Mooroolbark / Mooroolbark United (1974–1976, 1990–1991)
 Morwell Falcons (1982–1992)
 North Geelong Croatia / North Geelong Warriors (1992–1997, 2015, 2017)
 Port Melbourne Slavia / Prahran Slavia (1963–1970, 1973–80)
 Preston Makedonia / Preston Lions (1967, 1976–80, 1994–1995, 1997–2009)
 Richmond SC / Alemannia Richmond (1963, 2006–2013, 2016)
 Ringwood City Wilhelmina / Ringwood City (1963–1966, 1968–1986, 1988–1990)
 South Dandenong / Dandeong Thunder (1998–1999, 2001, 2009–2015)
 Springvale City (1985–1989, 1993–1996)
 Springvale White Eagles (1997–1999, 2007, 2011)
 St. Albans Saints (1984–2005, 2011, 2017)
 Sunshine City (1975–1982)
 Sunshine Georgies / Sunshine George Cross (1958–1983, 1992–1999, 2005–2007, 2009–2010)
 Thomastown Devils / Thomastown Zebras / Melbourne Raiders / Whittlesea Ranges (1985–1994, 1997–2000), Whittlesea Stallions (2002–2004)
 Werribee City Bees (1994–1995)
 Western Suburbs SC (1980, 1984–1988, 2007–2008)
 Westvale (1999)

See also
 National Premier Leagues Victoria Women

Notes

References

External links
 Results site
 VPL TV, official online broadcaster

 
National Premier Leagues
Soccer leagues in Victoria (Australia)
Recurring sporting events established in 1908
1908 establishments in Australia
Sports leagues established in 1908
Professional sports leagues in Australia
Second level football leagues in Asia